Tsukushi or tsukushin is an extracellular matrix protein of the small leucine rich proteoglycan (SLRP) family. In humans it is encoded by the TSKU gene.

Tsukushi is a non-canonical class IV SLRP. It is involved in early animal development.

References

Further reading 

Proteoglycans
Extracellular matrix proteins